The 2019 North Carolina Courage season is the team's third season as a professional women's soccer team. North Carolina Courage plays in the National Women's Soccer League, the top tier of women's soccer in the United States.

On September 21, the Courage clinched their third consecutive Shield with a 3–0 victory over the Utah Royals.

On October 27, the Courage defeated the Chicago Red Stars 4–0 to win their second consecutive NWSL Championship.

Team

Coaching Staff

 Source: North Carolina Courage

First-team roster

Player transactions

2019 NWSL College Draft
 Source: National Women's Soccer League

Players In

Players Out

Competitions

National Women's Soccer League

Preseason

 Source: North Carolina Courage

Regular season

 Source: North Carolina Courage''

Postseason playoffs

League table

Results summary

Results by round

International friendlies

As defending 2018 NWSL champions and defending 2018 Women's ICC champions, the Courage were selected to participate in and host the 2019 Women's International Champions Cup. They are scheduled to play English side Manchester City in the semi-final round.

Statistical leaders

Top scorers

Top assists

Shutouts

Awards

NWSL Annual Awards

Most Valuable Player: Debinha (finalist), Jaelene Hinkle (finalist)
Coach of the Year: Paul Riley (finalist)

NWSL Monthly Awards

NWSL Player of the Month

NWSL Team of the Month

NWSL Weekly Awards

NWSL Player of the Week

NWSL Goal of the Week

NWSL Save of the Week

References

North Carolina Courage seasons
North Carolina Courage